The 25th American Society of Cinematographers Awards were held on February 13, 2011, honoring the best cinematographers of film and television in 2010.

Winners and nominees

Film
 Wally Pfister – Inception
 Danny Cohen – The King's Speech
 Jeff Cronenweth – The Social Network
 Roger Deakins – True Grit
 Matthew Libatique – Black Swan

Television

Outstanding Achievement in Cinematography in Regular Series or Pilot
 Jonathan Freeman – Boardwalk Empire (Episode: "Home")
 Eagle Egilsson – Dark Blue (Episode: "Shell Game")
 Chris Manley – Mad Men (Episode: "Blowing Smoke")
 Kramer Morgenthau – Boardwalk Empire (Episode: "Family Limitation")
 David Stockton – Nikita (Episode: "Pilot")
 Michael Wale – Smallville (Episode: "Shield")
 Glen Winter – Smallville (Episode: "Abandoned")

Outstanding Achievement in Cinematography in Television Movies or Miniseries
 Stephen F. Windon – The Pacific (Episode: "Okinawa")
 David Gribble – Jesse Stone: No Remorse
 Jon Joffin – Alice (Episode: "Episode 2")

References

2010 film awards
2010 guild awards
2010
American
2010 in American cinema